Mokhtar Belkhiter (born January 15, 1992 in Oran) is an Algerian international football player. He is currently playing for CR Belouizdad in the Algerian Ligue Professionnelle 1.

An Algeria international, Belkhiter was part of the Algeria national team at the 2017 Africa Cup of Nations.

Club career
On April 30, 2011, Belklhiter was a starter in USM Blida's triumph in the 2011 Algerian Junior Cup Final against ES Sétif.

On July 14, 2011, Belkhiter signed a five-year contract with USM Alger. However, as he was still under contract with USM Blida and the club rejected his transfer request, he was forced to remain at the club.

Honours
USM Blida
 Algerian Junior Cup: 2010–11

Club Africain
 Tunisian Cup (1): 2016–17

Statistics

International career
On November 16, 2011, he was selected as part of Algeria's squad for the 2011 CAF U-23 Championship in Morocco.

References

External links
 

2011 CAF U-23 Championship players
Algerian footballers
Algerian Ligue Professionnelle 1 players
Algerian Ligue 2 players
Algeria under-23 international footballers
Living people
MC Oran players
Footballers from Oran
USM Blida players
Algeria youth international footballers
MC El Eulma players
Al-Qadsiah FC players
Algeria international footballers
2017 Africa Cup of Nations players
Association football forwards
Club Africain players
Algerian expatriate sportspeople in Tunisia
Expatriate footballers in Tunisia
Algerian expatriate sportspeople in Saudi Arabia
Expatriate footballers in Saudi Arabia
Tunisian Ligue Professionnelle 1 players
Saudi Professional League players
1992 births
21st-century Algerian people
2022 African Nations Championship players
Algeria A' international footballers